John Cooper may refer to:

Academics and science
 John Thomas Cooper (1790–1854), English chemist
 John Montgomery Cooper (1881–1949), American anthropologist, priest, sociologist
 John Cobb Cooper (1887–1967), American lawyer, administrator, aerospace expert
 John Miller Cooper (1912–2010), American kinesiology researcher, educator
 John A. D. Cooper (1918–2002), American medical education administrator
 John Philip Cooper (1923–2011), professor of agricultural botany
 John Cooper (Islamic studies scholar) (Yahya Cooper) (1947–1998), British Islamic scholar and professor at the University of Cambridge
 John Julius Cooper, 2nd Viscount Norwich (1929–2018), English historian
 John M. Cooper (philosopher) (1939–2022), American philosopher
 John M. Cooper (historian) (born 1940), American historian and educator
 John A. Cooper, American biochemist affiliated with Washington University School of Medicine

Arts and entertainment
 John Cooper (composer) (c. 1570–1626), English classical composer
 John Gilbert Cooper (1722–1769), British poet and miscellaneous writer
 John Cooper (actor) (1793–1870), English actor
 John Paul Cooper (1869–1933), arts and crafts designer in metalwork and jewelry
 John W. Cooper (1873–1966), American ventriloquist and singer 
 John Nelson Cooper (1906–1987), custom knife maker
 John Cooper (artist) (1942–2015), English comic illustrator
 John Cooper (author) (born 1958), Canadian writer and communications specialist
 John Cooper (musician) (born 1975), American singer for Skillet
 John Cooper (fl. 1980s–2010s), director of the Sundance Film Festival

Military
 John B. Cooper, US Air Force general
 John B. R. Cooper (1791–1872), California pioneer, sea captain
 John Laver Mather Cooper (1828–1891), U.S. Navy, Medal of Honor recipient
 John Cooper (British Army officer) (born 1955), commander of British forces in Iraq 2008

Politics
 John Cooper (MP for Worcester), in 1380 and 1395 Member of Parliament (MP) for Worcester
 John Cooper (MP for Maldon), in 1421 and 1425 MP for Maldon
 John Cooper (fl. 1529), MP for Berwick-upon-Tweed
 Sir John Cooper, 1st Baronet (died 1630), English landowner and politician
 John Cooper (died 1779), British politician
 John Cooper (New Jersey politician) (1729–1785), public official from New Jersey during the American Revolution
 John Tyler Cooper (1844–1912), American politician
 John G. Cooper (1872–1955), American politician
 John Sherman Cooper (1901–1991), U.S. Senator from Kentucky
 John Cooper (Arkansas politician) (born 1947), member of the Arkansas State Senate since 2014
 John Cooper (Tennessee politician) (born 1956), mayor of Nashville
 John Cooper (barrister) (born 1958), British barrister and Queen's Counsel
 John Lewis Cooper, Liberian businessman and government official

Sports
 John Cooper (footballer, born 1897) (1897–1975), English footballer
 John Cooper (Scottish footballer) (fl. 1930s), Scottish footballer
 John Cooper (car maker) (1923–2000), British racing driver & entrepreneur
 John Cooper (cricketer, born 1855) (1855–1928), English cricketer and solicitor
 John Cooper (cricketer, born 1922) (1922–2012), Australian cricketer
 John Cooper (Australian footballer) (1933–2020), Australian footballer
 John Cooper (American football) (born 1937), coach
 John Cooper (motorcyclist) (born 1938), British Grand Prix motorcycle racer
 John Cooper (hurdler) (1940–1974), British athlete
 John Cooper (tennis) (born 1946), Australian tennis player
 John Grantley Cooper (born 1954), Welsh chess master
 John Cooper (basketball) (born 1969), head men's basketball coach at Miami University

Other people
 John Cooper (archdeacon of Westmorland) (died 1896)
 John Cooper (archdeacon of Aston) (born 1933), British Anglican priest
 John Cooper (serial killer) (born 1944), serial killer from Milford Haven, Pembrokeshire
 John Henry Cooper (c. 1855–1910), English architect

Fictional
 John Cooper (Southland), a character on Southland
 John Cooper, a character in Desperados: Wanted Dead or Alive

See also
 Jack Cooper (disambiguation)
 Johnny Cooper (disambiguation)
 Jon Cooper (disambiguation)
 John Cooper Clarke, English performance poet